The Civic Liberal Alliance (abbr. Glas - lit. Voice/Vote) is a liberal political party in Croatia.  The party was founded by four former Croatian People's Party (HNS) MPs led by Anka Mrak Taritaš who were dissatisfied with HNS entering a coalition with the Croatian Democratic Union (HDZ) and supporting the cabinet of Andrej Plenković since June 2017.

History
The Party's founding congress was held on 9 July 2017, while it was officially registered with the Ministry of Public Administration on 26 July 2017.

Glas automatically became a parliamentary party with four MPs, making it the fifth largest party in the country in terms of parliamentary representation. In addition, Jozo Radoš also left HNS and joined Glas, so the party also has one MEP. Radoš sat with the Alliance of Liberals and Democrats for Europe group.

Another notable member is Vesna Pusić.

On 1 December 2017 the party was admitted into the Alliance of Liberals and Democrats for Europe Party as an affiliate member.

The party was one of the founding members of the Amsterdam Coalition, an electoral alliance of seven Croatian liberal political parties. The alliance was founded on 8 December 2018.

Ideology
Party president Mrak-Taritaš described Glas as "a modern, progressive, trans-ideological party in the centre-left, acceptable to people who are liberal, social-liberal and social-democratic." Party's emphasis will be placed on individual freedoms and rights, stable institutions and diversity as a comparative advantage.

Party stands for:

 the right of women to freely choose on abortion,
 extension of LGBT rights and civil rights protections,
 the right to vote at the local elections at the age of 16, 
 anti-fascism as the foundation of modern Croatia,
 separation of church and state, strengthening secularization and revision of all four concordats,
 comprehensive curriculum reform,
 removal of parafiscal tax,
 public administration reform,
 a stable judiciary,
 decentralisation.

Electoral history

Legislative

European Parliament

References

External links
  

2017 establishments in Croatia
Political parties established in 2017
Centrist parties in Croatia
Liberal parties in Croatia
Pro-European political parties in Croatia
Social liberal parties
Organizations based in Zagreb